William Higgs may refer to:
 William Higgs (politician), Australian politician
 William G. Higgs, American energy industry executive
 William Higgs (jockey), British jockey, trainer, owner and breeder
 William Alpheus Higgs, London tea merchant and sheriff of London and Middlesex